The Laffly V15T was a French light 4WD artillery tractor used during World War II. It was used to tow the 25 mm SA anti-tank gun. A personnel carrier and reconnaissance vehicle based on the same chassis was designated as V15R. The Laffly company itself only manufactured the first batch of 100 V15s, the rest of the production being taken over by Corre La Licorne.

References
 Vauvillier, F. & Touraine, J.-M. L'automobile sous l'uniforme 1939-40, Massin, 1992, 

Artillery tractors
World War II vehicles of France